Superficial lymphatic malformation  is a congenital malformation of the superficial lymphatics, presenting as groups of deep-seated, vesicle-like papules resembling frog spawn, at birth or shortly thereafter. Lymphangioma circumscriptum is the most common congenital lymphatic malformation. It is a benign condition and treatment is not required if the person who has it does not have symptoms from it.

Signs and symptoms
Lymphangioma circumscriptum is characterized by a rash on the skin featuring clear vesicles. The rash may be painful and is sometimes itchy. The vesicles often leak lymph and may bleed. The rash may appear similar to warts if the vesicles frequently break open.

Diagnosis
A biopsy of the affected skin and histological examination under the microscope is necessary to diagnose lymphangioma circumscriptum.

Differential diagnosis
Several other conditions may mimic lymphangioma circumscriptum. These conditions include infections such as an outbreak of herpes simplex, herpes simplex vegetans, molluscum contagiosum, verruca vulgaris, and condyloma acuminatum. Similarly, benign and cancerous non-infectious conditions may also present in a similar manner and include conditions such as angiokeratoma, dermatitis herpetiformis, hemangioma, epidermal nevus, lymphangiectasia, melanoma, angiosarcoma, and metastatic carcinomas.

Treatment
The condition is benign and does not require treatment if the affected person does not have symptoms. Lymphangioma circumscriptum is often treated when it causes troubling symptoms to the affected person (itching, pain) or due to concerns about its cosmetic appearance. Surgical removal (excision) of the affected layers of skin is the most common and effective treatment. Treatment with ablative carbon dioxide lasers is a less invasive method that can be used to improve the appearance of lymphangioma circumscriptum. These laser treatments require local anesthesia and may cause significant wounds.

See also 
 Lymphangioma
 Skin lesion
 List of cutaneous conditions

References

External links 

Cutaneous congenital anomalies